Augustinus Mokoya (born 2 June 1977) is a retired Namibian football midfielder.

References

1977 births
Living people
Namibian men's footballers
Namibia international footballers
Chief Santos players
Association football midfielders